Tan Tock Seng Hospital (abbreviation: TTSH) is district general hospital, It is tertiary referral hospital in Singapore, located in Novena. The hospital has 45 clinical and allied health departments, 16 specialist centres and is powered by more than 8,000 healthcare staff. Tan Tock Seng Hospital is Singapore’s second largest acute care general hospital with over 1,500 beds (second only to Singapore General Hospital). TTSH has the busiest trauma centre in the country; 100 trauma cases are seen every day and 100 trauma surgeries are performed daily.

TTSH is the flagship hospital of the National Healthcare Group and the principal teaching hospital for the NTU Lee Kong Chian School of Medicine. Its campus includes the National Centre for Infectious Diseases (NCID) and two national specialty centres, namely the National Skin Centre (NSC) and the National Neuroscience Institute (NNI).

History

It was later decided that the low-lying ground on which the hospital stood was unsuitable for the patients, and in 1903, the land on Moulmein Road, where the present hospital stands, was bought with donation of $50,000 by Loke Yew.  The new hospital was completed in 1909 by the Public Works Department.

As a result of a restructuring exercise in the local health-care scene, the hospital became a member of the National Healthcare Group in 2000.

Facilities 
As one of the largest multi-disciplinary hospitals in Singapore, TTSH operates more than 1700 beds with centres of excellence including the National Centre for Infectious Diseases (NCID), Institute for Geriatrics & Active Ageing (IGA), NHG Eye Institute (NHGEI), TTSH Rehabilitation Centre, and Ang Mo Kio Specialist Centre (AMKSC).

TTSH's 600-bed Integrated Care Hub will be ready in 2022 to provide for subacute care and rehabilitation. As a healthcare leader in population health, systems innovation, health technologies and workforce transformation, TTSH hosts Singapore's largest purpose-built innovation centre for healthcare – the Ng Teng Fong Centre for Healthcare Innovation (CHI) and its Co-Learning Network of 37 local and international partners.

National Centre for Infectious Diseases 

In 2003, the hospital was declared the designated hospital for SARS screening and treatment by the Ministry of Health due to its past experience with communicable diseases (the Communicable Disease Centre was located nearby) and was "effectively locked down" to contain the outbreak, which began with Esther Mok. At the lobby of the hospital, a memorial plaque was dedicated in memory of the hospital's doctors and healthcare workers, two of whom died of the disease, who worked tirelessly during the SARS epidemic and Minister of Health Gan Kim Yong paid tribute to the hospital's staff.

On 13 December 2018, the Communicable Disease Centre ceased operations as a medical facility, concluding its 121 years of operations. All operations moved to the National Centre for Infectious Diseases, which was officially opened on 7 September 2019 by Minister for Health Gan Kim Yong. The 330-bed facility is designed to manage an outbreak of the size of the SARS outbreak, boasting state-of-the-art technologies. In addition, the facility tracks patients in the building to prevent the spread of outbreaks and houses Singapore's first high-level isolation unit for highly contagious, even lethal diseases like Ebola.

National specialty centres

National Skin Centre 

The National Skin Centre is an outpatient specialist dermatology centre. It handles a patient load of about 1,000 patients daily. It started its operations on 1 November 1988 after taking over the treatment of skin diseases from Middle Road Hospital. It provides specialised dermatological services, trains medical students and postgraduates, and undertakes research in dermatology and conducts continuing medical education for doctors and paramedical personnel.

National Neuroscience Institute 

The National Neuroscience Institute (NNI) is the national and regional specialty centre for the management and care of neurological diseases in Singapore, providing treatment for a broad range of illnesses that affect the brain, spine, nerve and muscle. As the national and international centre of excellence in the neurosciences, its mission and goals rest upon three strengths – patient care, research and education. Offering a comprehensive range of Neurology, Neurosurgery and Neuroradiology services, the NNI provides neuroscience care not only in Singapore but in the region.

The establishment of NNI in 1999  resulted in the transfers of the Department of Neurology and Neurosurgery from Tan Tock Seng Hospital (TTSH) to form the foundations of clinical service. A new department of Neuroradiology was also initiated to provide the specialised diagnostic imaging and interventional services for neurological diseases. Today, NNI has a campus co-located with SGH in Outram, but — unlike other SingHealth specialty centres — also has a campus located with Tan Tock Seng Hospital, and provides specialty services to most other hospitals in Singapore as well.

References

National Heritage Board (2002), Singapore's 100 Historic Places, Archipelago Press,

External links

National Skin Centre
National Neuroscience Institute

Hospital buildings completed in 1847
Hospital buildings completed in 1861
Hospital buildings completed in 1909
Hospital buildings completed in 2000
Hospitals established in 1884
Hospitals in Singapore
Medical education in Singapore
Teaching hospitals
Novena, Singapore
Nanyang Technological University
1847 establishments in the British Empire
Hokkien place names